Star rank may refer to:

 A number of military rank designations in various countries
 Six-star rank
 Five-star rank
 Four-star rank
 Three-star rank
 Two-star rank

 Ranks in the Boy Scouts of America § Star

See related 
Star (heraldry)